Filamin A, alpha (FLNA) is a protein that in humans is encoded by the FLNA gene.

Function 
Actin-binding protein, or filamin, is a 280-kD protein that crosslinks actin filaments into orthogonal networks in cortical cytoplasm and participates in the anchoring of membrane proteins for the actin cytoskeleton. Remodeling of the cytoskeleton is central to the modulation of cell shape and migration. Filamin A, encoded by the FLNA gene, is a widely expressed filamin that regulates the reorganization of the actin cytoskeleton by interacting with integrins, transmembrane receptor complexes, and secondary messengers. At least 31 disease-causing mutations in this gene have been discovered.

Structure 
The protein structure includes an actin binding N terminal domain, 24 internal repeats and 2 hinge regions.

Interactions 
Filamin has been shown to interact with:

 BRCA2, 
 CD29 
 CASR, 
 FBLIM1, 
 FILIP1, 
 FLNB, 
 NPHP1, 
 RALA, 
 SH2B3, 
 TRIO,  and
 VHL.

RNA editing 

The edited residue was previously recorded as a single nucleotide polymorphism(SNP) in dbSNP.

Type 

A to I RNA editing is catalyzed by a family of adenosine deaminases acting on RNA (ADARs) that specifically recognize adenosines within double-stranded regions of pre-mRNAs and deaminate them to inosine. Inosines  are recognised as guanosine by the cells translational machinery. There are three members of the ADAR family ADARs 1-3 with ADAR 1 and ADAR 2 being the only enzymatically active members.ADAR3 is thought to have a regulatory role in the brain. ADAR1 and ADAR 2 are widely expressed in tissues while ADAR 3 is restricted to the brain. The double stranded regions of RNA are formed  by base-pairing between residues in a region complementary  to  the region of the editing site. This complementary region is  usually found  in a neighbouring intron but can also be located in an exonic sequence. The region that base pairs with the editing region is known as an Editing Complentary Sequence (ECS).

Site 

The one editing site of FLNA pre-mRNA is located within amino acid 2341 of the final protein. The Glutamine (Q) codon is altered due to a site specific deamination of an adenosine  at the editing site to an  Arginine (R) codon. The editing region is predicted to form a double stranded region of 32 base pairs in length with a complementary sequence about 200 nucleotides downstream of the editing site. This ECS is found in an intronic sequence. Editing at the Q/R site is likely to involve both ADAR1 and ADAR2.Mice ADAR2 knockouts show a decrease in editing at the Q/R site.ADAR1 double knockouts have no effect on editing.

Structure 

The edited adenosine is located in the 22 immunogloulin like repeat of the protein. This region is an integrin β binding domain and a RAC1 binding domain. The amino acid change is likely to effect the electrostatic potential of the binding domains. FLNA editing site is 2 nucleotides from a splice site like the R/G site of GluR-2. Both transcripts have 7/8  identical  nucleotides around their editing sites. Since it is  widely thought that editing at the GLUR-2 Q/R site influences splicing, the sequence and editing site similarity could mean that editing at the FLNA site could also regulate splicing. In vitro experiments of gluR-2 have shown that presence of ADAR2 results in inhibition of splicing. Analysis of EST data for FLNA show that there is a link between editing of the last exon codon and retention of the following intron.

Function 

The change in electrostatic potential is likely to effect the binding of FLNA to the many proteins it interacts with.

DNA repair

Interaction of FLNA with the BRCA1 protein is required for efficient regulation of early stages of DNA repair processes.  FLNA is implicated in the control of the DNA repair process of homologous recombination and non-homologous end joining.

References

Further reading

External links 
 GeneReview/NCBI/NIH/UW entry on Otopalatodigital Spectrum Disorders
 GeneReviews/NIH/NCBI/UW entry on X-Linked Periventricular Heterotopia or Bilateral Periventricular Nodular Heterotopia

de:Filamin